Warrah Station in New South Wales was created when the Australian Agricultural Company (AA Co) was granted a 249,600 acre estate known as Warrah Estate in the County of Buckland in the NSW.

Localities in New South Wales